St Gabriel's Church is a Church of England parish church in Walsall, West Midlands.  Its parish includes Fullbrook, Caldmore,  Bescot, The Delves, Palfrey, and Tamebridge and Yew Tree.

History 

The church of St Gabriel the Archangel, Fullbrook, originated in a mission founded in 1936 when a conventional district was formed out of the parishes of St. Matthew, Walsall, St. Michael, Caldmore, St. Mary, Palfrey, and St. Paul, Wood Green, Wednesbury. A curate-in-charge was appointed by the bishop of Lichfield and received a stipend of £300. (fn. 399) Services were at first held in the mission church of the Good Shepherd at Delves Green, transferred from St. Paul's parish.  In 1938 a site in Walstead Road was acquired for the new church, which was consecrated in 1939 by Right Reverend Edward Woods, Bishop of Lichfield, on 4 February 1939. The cost of erection was met largely by a bequest from J. F. Laing, Vicar of St. Michael's Caldmore 1877–1921. Late in 1939 the district became a parish.

The living, at first a perpetual curacy and from 1969 a vicarage, has remained in the gift of the bishop of Lichfield.

The incumbent's house was in Broadway; the present house south-east of the church was built in 1956.

A mission church and hall, dedicated to the Annunciation, was built within the parish on the new Yew Tree estate.

St. Gabriel's was designed by Lavender & Twentyman of Wolverhampton. It is a red-brick building in a modern style and consists of chancel surmounted by tower, north Lady chapel, nave, and west baptistery; there is a gallery over the baptistery. At the west end the church is joined by a covered way to a hall, opened in 1971.

Clergy

Vicars who have served St Gabriel's 
1935 - 1948         Fr A. Fraser

1948 - 1954         Fr J. McCullough

1954 - 1971         Fr S. Thomas

1972 - 2010         Fr T R H Coyne

2011–present     Rev Prebendary Mark McIntyre CMP SSC

Assistant Priests 
1958 - 1961        Fr E Booth

1967 - 1970        Fr K Hill

1970 - 1973        Fr H Pascoe

1974 - 1977        Fr N Clapp

1977 – 1978        Fr C Marshall

1980 - 1983        Fr B Williams

1988 - 1990        Fr G Matthews

1990                   Fr D Pearce

1995 - 2004        Fr W Poultney

2000 - 2003        Fr E Davies

2005 - 2010        Fr N Pierce

2013 - 2016        Fr S Oakes

2019 - 2022        Fr R Hume

References
https://www.british-history.ac.uk/vch/staffs/vol17/pp226-239

External links 
St Gabriel's Church, Walsall
 St Gabriel's Church Lads and Church Girls Brigade

Gabriel's Church, St
Walsall, Saint Gabriel's Church
Churches completed in 1939
Walsall, Saint Gabriel's Church
Buildings and structures in Walsall
Walsall
Walsall
Richard Twentyman